Leonard Stanley Ceglarski (June 27, 1926 – December 16, 2017) was an American ice hockey player and coach. He was an All-American left wing on Boston College's 1949 NCAA championship team, and was captain of the 1950–51 squad. He was also a member of the U.S. Olympic hockey team that won the silver medal at the 1952 Winter Olympic Games in Oslo, Norway. Ceglarski was also known as a baseball player. While at Boston College, his .429 batting average as a senior second baseman was best in New England.

Coaching career
A native of East Walpole, Massachusetts, Ceglarski taught and coached at Walpole High for four years before beginning his collegiate coaching career. He took the reins of the Golden Knights’ program from retiring Clarkson mentor Bill Harrison. At Clarkson, he had various responsibilities. He was responsible not only for varsity coaching, but for the freshman team, the rink, the equipment, and the laundry, and served as his own secretary and the team's skate sharpener.

Clarkson College
Ceglarski began his coaching career at Clarkson College of Technology in 1958. When Ceglarski began his coaching career in the late 1950s, he was the fourth head coach in Clarkson's storied tradition. It took Ceglarski only four seasons to guide the Knights to their first NCAA championship game. In 1962, Clarkson beat Michigan 5–4 to make hockey history by becoming the first Eastern team to defeat a Western squad in the first round of the Final Four since 1954. Clarkson fell to Michigan Tech in the 1962 title game, closing out a 22–3–1 campaign.

During the 1965–66 season, Ceglarski boasted his best Clarkson squad, winning the ECAC Tournament and once again making it to the deciding game in the NCAA tournament. The Knights defeated Denver, 4–3, before falling to the Michigan State Spartans in the title game. The club had a 24–3 record in 1965–66. At the end of the season, he was awarded his first Spencer Penrose Trophy, which goes annually to the national coach of the year.  He also earned this honor in 1978 and 1985.

For the third time in less than 10 years, Ceglarski's team advanced to the NCAA Championship when the Knights battled Cornell for the 1970 NCAA championship. After skating past Michigan Tech, 4–3, in the semifinals, Clarkson fell just short against the Cornell Big Red, suffering a 6–4 loss in Lake Placid. The club finished the season with a 24–8 record. He led the Golden Knights to three national championship games, compiling a 254–97–11 record. He left Clarkson in 1972 to become hockey coach at his alma mater Boston College. The vacancy left by Ceglarski would be filled by Jerry York, who would also go on to coach at his alma mater, Boston College.

Boston College
When long-time Boston College coach John "Snooks" Kelley retired as the Eagles coach in 1972, Ceglarski decided to return to his alma mater. While at Boston College, Ceglarski guided the Eagles to 419 victories through two decades at the Heights. Ceglarski retired in 1992 with 689 career wins. Ceglarski's vacancy would be filled by interim coach Steve Cedorchuk, but after two seasons, Jerry York again followed Ceglarski by becoming the Eagles' head coach.

Coaching legacy
When Ceglarski concluded his 34-year hockey coaching career in 1992, he retired with the most victories ever amassed in the history of the game at the college level. His first win came with Clarkson's 10–2 win at Providence on December 5, 1958. His teams at Clarkson and Boston College won 673 games, lost only 339 and tied 38. Over that time, Ceglarski-coached teams had only four losing campaigns.

Serving for 14 years as the head coach of the Clarkson Golden Knights, Ceglarski compiled a .717 winning percentage, posting a 254–97–10 overall record from 1958–1972. He guided Clarkson to four NCAA Tournament berths and its first ECAC Tournament title. Ceglarski's teams finished as runners-up in the NCAA Tournament in 1961–62, 1965–66, 1969–70 and 1977–78. The first three were the only Clarkson squads to have reached the national championship game. Ceglarski's 1977–78 BC squad also finished as NCAA runner-up, losing to Boston University in the finals.

In 34 seasons (1958–1992), he became the winningest coach in the history of college hockey with a record of 673–339–37. In 14 seasons at Clarkson, he had a record of 254–97–10 and a record of 419–242–27 in 20 seasons at Boston College. He is the first man in college hockey ever to coach 1,000 games. He was inducted into the Boston College Varsity Club Athletic Hall of Fame in 1974.

Honors
Several honors have been bestowed upon Ceglarski. He was a 1974 member of the Boston College Varsity Club Athletic Hall of Fame. In 1990, he won the Lester Patrick Trophy, an annual award presented for outstanding service to hockey in the United States. Ceglarski was also inducted into the U.S. Hockey Hall of Fame in 1992, and was named the 1996 recipient of the Legend of College Hockey Award. In 1993, Ceglarski was inducted into the National Polish American Sports Hall of Fame. Ceglarski was the winner of the 1984–85 CCM / Bob Kullen Award. Sponsored by CCM, the award is given in the name of Bob Kullen, who served as head coach of the New Hampshire Wildcats. The award goes to the head coach who is considered to have demonstrated the highest number of significant accomplishments over the course of the season as voted by the conference's head coaches.

The Len Ceglarski Award for Individual Sportsmanship was given by the league to one player who had consistently demonstrated superior conduct and sportsmanship on the ice. The directors of Hockey East established the Award in 1992. Each school nominates one player and the award is then voted upon by head coaches, sports information directors and league officials. The first winner was Joe Flanagan, a senior forward from the University of New Hampshire. One of Ceglarski's former players, John T. McLennan honored his mentor by creating a $1.5 million endowment to fund the Leonard S. Ceglarski Chair at Clarkson. McLennan was offered an athletic scholarship to play hockey at Clarkson in 1964, and McLennan earned a master's degree in industrial management and went on to become president and CEO of Bell Canada before retiring in 1997. McLennan credits Ceglarski with the success he achieved in his life. The chair will fund the Clarkson men's head hockey coach position.

Playing record

Head coaching record

Awards and honors

See also
List of college men's ice hockey coaches with 400 wins

References

External links

1926 births
2017 deaths
American ice hockey coaches
American men's ice hockey left wingers
Boston College Eagles baseball players
Boston College Eagles football players
Boston College Eagles men's ice hockey coaches
Boston College Eagles men's ice hockey players
Clarkson Golden Knights men's ice hockey coaches
Ice hockey coaches from Massachusetts
Ice hockey players at the 1952 Winter Olympics
Lester Patrick Trophy recipients
Medalists at the 1952 Winter Olympics
Olympic silver medalists for the United States in ice hockey
People from Walpole, Massachusetts
United States Hockey Hall of Fame inductees
NCAA men's ice hockey national champions
AHCA Division I men's ice hockey All-Americans
Ice hockey players from Massachusetts